Henry Randall Baskett III (born September 4, 1982) is a former American football wide receiver who played in the National Football League for the Minnesota Vikings, Philadelphia Eagles and Indianapolis Colts.

A native of Clovis, New Mexico, Baskett played college football for the University of New Mexico. As a college football player, Baskett was a leading wide receiver and earned all-academic honors all his years at New Mexico and All-Mountain West Conference honors in his senior season.

In 2006, Baskett signed with the Minnesota Vikings as a rookie undrafted free agent and was traded that season to the Philadelphia Eagles. Baskett completed his rookie season with the Eagles with 22 receptions for an average of 20.1 yards per catch and two touchdowns. In 2009, Baskett joined the Indianapolis Colts. He returned to the Eagles in 2010, but was released and signed with the Vikings.

Baskett married Playboy model Kendra Wilkinson in 2009. Wilkinson and Baskett were co-stars on Kendra, a reality TV series following Wilkinson's life from 2009 to 2011. They subsequently co-starred on WEtv's Kendra on Top from 2012 until 2017.

Early years
Baskett was born in Clovis, New Mexico. Baskett's parents are Henry Randall "Hank" Baskett, Jr., who worked for the Air Force before becoming director of a social service program, and Judy Baskett, who works as a financial officer at Cannon Air Force Base in Clovis. He attended Clovis High School.

College career
When Baskett attended the University of New Mexico, he was its football team's leading receiver in 2004 and 2005, earning him the Reese Leroy Hill Memorial Award as the team's Offensive Player of the Year during those years. Additionally, he earned All-Mountain West Conference (MWC) honors as a senior, posting 67 receptions for 1,071 yards and nine touchdowns. A four-time all-academic MWC honoree, he graduated with a degree in General Management.

Professional career

Minnesota Vikings
Baskett originally signed with the Minnesota Vikings as a rookie undrafted free agent in 2006 and was traded to the Philadelphia Eagles in exchange for wide receiver Billy McMullen.

Philadelphia Eagles
Baskett had 112 receiving yards and one touchdown against the Dallas Cowboys and 177 receiving yards and one touchdown against the Atlanta Falcons. For his performance in these games, Baskett was awarded rookie of the week honors. He completed his rookie season with 22 receptions for 464 yards (21.1 yards per catch) and two touchdowns. He was named the 2007 special teams Most Valuable Player (MVP).
In 2008, he started another six games, playing in 16 to record 33 receptions, 440 yards, and three touchdowns for a 13.3-yard average.

He headed into the 2009 offseason as a restricted free agent. He was tendered a one-year contract on February 23. Because the Eagles had been carrying seven wide receivers, he was made expendable and released on September 15, 2009, to make room for Michael Vick on the 53-man roster.

Indianapolis Colts
On September 17, 2009, Baskett signed a one-year contract with the Indianapolis Colts after Anthony Gonzalez suffered a knee injury.  On February 7, 2010, during Super Bowl XLIV versus the New Orleans Saints, Baskett failed to recover an onside kick (that hit him in the hands) at the start of the second half, which led to a Saints touchdown. New Orleans won the game, 31–17. The next day, February 8, 2010, Baskett was released by the Colts.

Philadelphia Eagles (second stint)
On March 12, 2010, Baskett signed a one-year contract with the Philadelphia Eagles for $800,000. He was released on September 21, 2010.

Minnesota Vikings (second stint)
On September 22, 2010, Baskett re-signed with the Minnesota Vikings. He played in eight games in 2010, mostly on special teams, with one reception. On March 3, 2011, he was not extended a tender by the Vikings, making him an unrestricted free agent, but effectively ending his NFL career.

NFL statistics
Source:

Reality television
Baskett co-stars in a spinoff of The Girls Next Door, titled Kendra, which focuses on his wife Kendra Wilkinson's life after leaving the Playboy Mansion. The Girls Next Door executive producer Kevin Burns serves in the same capacity on the series. The show premiered on June 7, 2009, and had record-breaking numbers for E! with 2.6 million viewers, the highest-rated reality debut for the network since 2002's premiere of The Anna Nicole Show. E! ordered eight episodes. Season 2 ran from March 14 until June 8, 2010. The show was renewed once more, and the third season began airing in November 2010. The fourth season of the show premiered September 2011. The show has ended its run on E! and has now become Kendra on Top which began airing on WE tv on Tuesday, June 5, 2012. Season 2 ran from September to November 2013 and season 3 ran from October to November 2014.

Personal life
Baskett proposed to his girlfriend, former Playboy model Kendra Wilkinson, on top of the Space Needle after dating for six months. The couple married on June 27, 2009 at the Playboy Mansion. Baskett and Wilkinson have a son, Henry Randall "Hank" Baskett IV (born December 11, 2009) and daughter, Alijah Mary Baskett (born May 16, 2014). The couple divorced in 2018 after Baskett was allegedly discovered having an affair with a transgender model. 

Baskett resides in Voorhees Township, New Jersey.

In popular culture

In the novel, The Silver Linings Playbook by Matthew Quick, central character Pat Peoples was given Baskett's Philadelphia Eagles number 84 jersey as a present. Over the 2006–07 season, Baskett became Peoples's favorite player and, for Christmas, he received an autographed picture of Baskett.

References

External links

Article on Philadelphia Eagles website
Indianapolis Colts bio
Minnesota Vikings bio

1982 births
Living people
African-American players of American football
American football wide receivers
Indianapolis Colts players
Minnesota Vikings players
New Mexico Lobos football players
People from Clovis, New Mexico
People from Voorhees Township, New Jersey
Philadelphia Eagles players
Players of American football from San Diego
Players of American football from New Mexico
Players of American football from New Jersey
Sportspeople from the Delaware Valley
21st-century African-American sportspeople
20th-century African-American people